Mouna Esmaeilzadeh (born April 15, 1980) is a medical doctor, neuroscientist, entrepreneur and TV personality. She has a Ph.D. in neuroscience from Stockholm Brain Institute at Karolinska Institutet in Stockholm. She often appears on Swedish TV covering science and technology.

Biography
Mouna Esmaeilzadeh was born in Tehran and moved to Stockholm, Sweden with her family at the age of three. Her older brother is Saeid Esmaeilzadeh. She is married to Danish entrepreneur Rasmus Ingerslev one of the founders of Barry's Bootcamp.

Esmaeilzadeh began her academic career studying philosophy at Stockholm University and received her master's degree at University of Oslo. She went on to study medicine at Karolinska Institutet receiving her medical license in 2005 and her Ph.D. in neuroscience in 2011 specializing in PET-imaging and the dopamine system in the brain. Her thesis was written at the Department of Clinical Neuroscience at Karolinska Institutet and had the title of "Towards a novel treatment of Huntington's Disease".

She competes as a celebrity dancer in Let's Dance 2022, which is broadcast by TV4.

Entrepreneurship
Esmaeilzadeh founded SciLife Clinic in 2009, a longevity clinic. Esmaeilzadeh has been the doctor and personal advisor to the Swedish astronaut Christer Fuglesang and Swedish business icon Anders Wall.

Scholarship
Her work on longevity has been cited in medical publications on the subject.

Public speaking 
Esmaeilzadeh is a recurring guest at Swedish national TV4 Nyhetsmorgon speaking about popular science, where she covers topics such as longevity, artificial intelligence, and genetics.

References

Living people
21st-century Swedish physicians
Swedish neuroscientists
Swedish women neuroscientists
Karolinska Institute alumni
Swedish people of Iranian descent
Esmaeilzadeh family
1980 births